Julian Wright (born 1987) is an American basketball player.

Julian Wright may also refer to:

Julian Wright (economist) (born 1969), New Zealand economist
Julian Wright (historian), British historian
Julian M. Wright (1884–1938), American attorney and judge